Prime Risk is a 1985 thriller film directed by Michael Farkas and starring Lee Montgomery and Toni Hudson.

Plot summary
A female engineer, with the assistance of her pilot-wannabe male friend, discovers a way to rip off automated teller machines, but in doing so stumbles upon a plot to destroy the U.S. monetary system.

Cast

External links
 

1985 films
American television films
1980s English-language films
1980s crime thriller films
Political thriller films
Films shot in Virginia
Films shot in Washington, D.C.
Films about financial crises